This is a list of members of the European Parliament for Germany in the 2014 to 2019 session. German MEPs represent the constituency of the same name.

List

See also 

 2014 European Parliament election in Germany

Lists of Members of the European Parliament for Germany
Lists of Members of the European Parliament 2014–2019
MEPs for Germany 2014–2019